In music, Op. 157 stands for Opus number 157. Compositions that are assigned this number include:

 Ries – Der Sieg des Glaubens
 Saint-Saëns – Fantaisie No. 3 in C major
 Strauss – Nachtfalter